Carter Smith (born September 6, 1971) is an American filmmaker and fashion photographer. He is best known for directing the films The Ruins (2008), Jamie Marks Is Dead (2014) and Swallowed (2022).

Life and career
A native of Bowdoinham, Maine, Smith moved to New York City after graduating from Mt. Ararat High School in 1989. He enrolled at the Fashion Institute of Technology but later dropped out to pursue a career in fashion photography. Smith has shot photo spreads for Vogue, GQ, and W Magazine, as well as numerous celebrity photo shoots. Smith began his career as a filmmaker directing commercials for clients such as Lancôme, Tommy Hilfiger and Tiffany's. In 2006, Smith directed the short horror film, Bugcrush, which was based on a short story by Scott Treleaven. The film won the Short Filmmaking Award at the Sundance Film Festival. Smith's next effort was his feature-film debut with a big-screen adaptation of Scott Smith's 2006 horror novel The Ruins. Smith's short film, Yearbook, debuted at the 2011 Sundance Film Festival. Carter Smith is openly gay.

Filmography

Film

Television

See also
 LGBT culture in New York City
 List of LGBT people from New York City

References

External links

Interview with Horror.com
 

1971 births
American photographers
Living people
People from Bowdoinham, Maine
Film directors from Maine
LGBT film directors
LGBT people from Maine
21st-century LGBT people